Salamis anteva is a butterfly in the family Nymphalidae. It is found on Madagascar. The habitat consists of forests.

It is a butterfly with a black body covered with orange-brown hair; claviform antennae; above the orange-colored, anterior wings edged with black integrating a bluish-whitish spot; posterior also orange and margins along the veins of the wing brown - black. The underside is gray - black and reminds of a dead leaf, which serves as camouflage; a whitish line runs through the wings of the posterior edge of the hindwing of the anterior edge of the forewing: between this "line" and the body, the wings are darker than between the "line" and the edges of the wings. Its wings are bent.

References

Butterflies described in 1870
Junoniini
Taxa named by Christopher Ward (entomologist)
Butterflies of Africa